Stephen Bernard   was an Irish politician.

Bernard was born in Dublin and educated at Trinity College, Dublin. From 1727 to 1760, he was MP for Charlemont in County Cork.

References

Alumni of Trinity College Dublin
Irish MPs 1727–1760
Members of the Parliament of Ireland (pre-1801) for County Cork constituencies